Another Breath is the third studio album by Ellen Foley.

Track listing

Personnel
Ellen Foley - vocals
Phil Grande - guitar
Tony Bridges - bass
Tommy Mandel - keyboards, synthesizer
Benjy King - synthesizer
Bob Riley - drums
Lenny Pickett - saxophone
Elaine Caswell, Maria Vidal, Zephryn Conte - backing vocals
Lou Christie, Ellie Greenwich, Jeff Kent, Susan Collins, Vini Poncia, Zora Rasmussen, Ellen Foley - additional backing vocals
Technical
Bob Schaper - associate producer, engineer

References
 http://www.discogs.com/Ellen-Foley-Another-Breath/master/100906
http://www.amazon.com/Another-Breath-Ellen-Foley/dp/B000UZDGGK/ref=sr_1_1?ie=UTF8&qid=1348687142&sr=8-1&keywords=ellen+foley+another+breath
http://www.discogs.com/Ellen-Foley-Another-Breath/release/1610989

1983 albums
Ellen Foley albums
Albums produced by Vini Poncia
Epic Records albums